The Great Detective is a Chinese fantasy suspense detective film directed by Roy Chow, starring Han Geng, Yin Zheng and Zhang Huiwen, it is based on Huo Sang Detective Stories by Cheng Xiaoqing. It was release in China on January 25, 2019.

Cast
Han Geng
Yin Zheng
Zhang Huiwen
Carina Lau
Guo Xiaodong
Feng Jiayi
Law Kar-ying
Jonathan Wong
Yu Yang
Cai Wenjing

Production
Principal photography took place in Prague, Czech Republic and Shanghai, China. It began filming from 2 June to 8 September 2016, with additional shooting was completed in January 2017.

References

Chinese fantasy films
2019 fantasy films
Chinese crime films
Chinese detective films
Chinese suspense films
2010s crime films
Films based on Chinese novels
Films based on crime novels
Films shot in Prague
Films shot in Shanghai
2019 films
2010s Mandarin-language films
 Films directed by Roy Chow